Moshood may refer to:

Abdul Aziz Moshood (born 1968), retired Nigerian footballer
Moshood Abiola Polytechnic, tertiary learning institution in Abeokuta, Ogun State, Nigeria
Moshood Kashimawo Olawale Abiola (1937–1998), Nigerian Yoruba businessman, publisher, politician and aristocrat of the Egba clan